Tinka Kurti ( Thani; born 17 December 1932) is an Albanian actress. Her body of work, spanning 60 years, includes more than 50 feature movies and 150 theatre plays has been awarded her with the People's Artist of Albania medal.

Biography 
Tinka was born in Sarajevo, Bosnia and Herzegovina (then part of Yugoslavia) to an Albanian father and Hungarian mother. She was the oldest of four children. At a young age her family returned to the city of Shkodra in northern part of Albania. It is in Shkodra where she would spend most of her life and join the theatre at a young age.

In 1947 she was expelled from the Liceu Artistik (School of Arts) in Tirana and was never able to graduate. However, this did not stop her from pursuing her acting career. She made her first theatre appearance at the age of 16, a minor role, in the play Dasma Shkodrane (Wedding from Shkodra.) From 1949 she became a member of the Theatre Migjeni in Shkodra where she was part of over 120 plays (dramas and comedies). Such plays include "Gjaku i Arbrit", "Histori Irkutase", "Toka Jonë", "Fisheku në pajë" and "Fejesa e Çehovit".

Kurti did not limit herself only to theatre and decided to try film too. In 1958, she was chosen as the leading female role in the first Albanian feature film "Tana". What followed was an endless series of film roles that would rightfully make her name a treasure of Albanian art. Some include Mother Pashako in "Yjet e netëve të gjata", the Mother in Çifti i lumtur, Sinjorina Mançini in Vajzat me kordele të kuqe, the Grandmother in Zemra e Nënës.

Two cinemas in Tirana and Durres are named after her. The same is the school of Lekbibaj (a village of Albania).

In 2003, the Albanian director, Esat Teliti, made a bibliographical documentary as a tribute to her life. It was simply named "Tinka".

Kurti continues her acting career. She once said: "I don't fear the old age, not even death. But, I do fear the senility of the brain, and when that moment will come, I think I would be dead twice. That's why I want to work."

Personal life 
Tinka was married with Palok Kurti in 1951 until his death in 1997. They had a son named Zef Kurti who died in March 6, 2018 at 65 from a heart attack.

After her son's death in January 2022, she published her biographical book called "Diary of a husband"

Filmography
Sofia Film 2022
Bota – 2014
Ne Kerkim te Kujt – 2012
Gjalle! (Alive!) – 2009
Familjet (Families) – 2009
Ne dhe Lenini (Lenin and Us) – 2009
Mira – 2008/II
Etjet e Kosoves (Kosova: Desperate Search) – 2006
Nata (The night) – 1998
Zemra e Nënës (Mother's heart) – 1995
Në emër të lirisë (In the name of freedom) – 1987
Hije që mbeten pas (Shadows left behind) -1985
Besa e kuqe (Red faith) – 1982
Qortimet e vjeshtës (Autumn's reproach) – 1982
Si gjithë të tjerët (Like all the others) -1981
Mengjeze te reja (New mornings) – 1980
Nusja (The bride) – 1980
Gjeneral gramafoni (The general gramophone) – 1978
Vajzat me kordele të kuqe (Girls with red ribbons) – 1978
Emblema e dikurshme – 1976
 Çifti i lumtur (The happy couple) – 1975
Lumë drite (River of light) – 1975
Operacion Zjarri (Fire operation) – 1973
Yjet e netëve të gjata – (Stars of long nights) – 1972
Guximtarët (The brave) – 1970
Tana (Tana) – 1958

References

1932 births
Living people
20th-century Albanian actresses
21st-century Albanian actresses
Albanian actresses
Albanian film actresses
Albanian stage actresses
People from Shkodër
People's Artists of Albania